Shahiduddin Chowdhury Anne is a Bangladesh Nationalist Party politician and a former Jatiya Sangsad member representing the Lakshmipur-3 constituency.

Career
Annie was elected to parliament from Laxmipur-3 as a Bangladesh Nationalist Party candidate in 2001 and 2008. He is the Publicity Affairs Secretary of the party. His 2018 election campaign was attacked by Bangladesh Jubo League and Bangladesh Chhatra League members.

In August 2008, Annie was jailed after he had surrendered on charges for extorting Tk 25 lakh from a construction firm in 2005.

In October 2014, Anti-Corruption Commission filed charges against Annie for amassing illegal wealth worth Tk 1.4 core and concealing information about Tk 13.14 lakh.

In January 2016, Annie was sent to jail after two Dhaka courts denied him bail in nine violence cases.

In January 2019, Annie got a bail in a case filed over a clash during the national elections campaign.

References

Living people
People from Lakshmipur District
Bangladesh Nationalist Party politicians
8th Jatiya Sangsad members
9th Jatiya Sangsad members
Place of birth missing (living people)
Year of birth missing (living people)